Tamra Davis (born January 22, 1962) is an American film, television and music video director.

Early life
Davis was born the second out of four children in Studio City, California. She was exposed to the media industry at an early age by her grandfather, a comedy writer, and her grandmother, who was an actress at Fox. Davis and her family constantly watched films and she aspired to become an actress. In the 11th grade, Davis dropped out of high school and met Egyptian film producer Ibrahim Moussa. Ibrahim took Davis to Italy for six months to work.

Returning to the U.S., Davis worked at an art gallery but soon quit to work at American Zoetrope in an apprentice position. The studio was struggling to complete Francis Ford Coppola's Waterloo, One From the Heart; the hectic schedule allowed Davis to study Coppola's directing and the business. Coppola suggested to Davis that she go to school, at which point she then attended Los Angeles City College.

Career
Davis first shot a film using a super 8 mm camera during her time at Los Angeles City College.

As soon as she got out of school, Davis sent out a package of videos that she had done and was hired to do a video for the band Hüsker Dü. Davis states that music videos "played a huge role in developing my sensibility as a director. There's much less sexism in the video world and they're open to women. But more important, with video you're always being pushed to experiment and come up with something new." During her career, Davis ended up directing over 155 music videos. While working at MTV, Davis was encouraged to engage in her empathy towards multicultural and feminist issues. Christina Lane stated in her book Feminist Hollywood: From Born in Flames to Point Break that as a person who was knowledgeable towards feminist politics, Tamra Davis wanted to empower young women to feel good about their sexuality. Lane also mentioned that Davis used her platform to voice feminist ideas and empower girls.

A writer at the Los Angeles Times reported, "Over the past seven years, Tamra Davis has made a name for herself directing cutting-edge videos for some of the thorniest acts in popular music. As director of choice for performers such as N.W.A, Sonic Youth, and Black Flag."

Davis participated in The Polygram Video's program called No Alternative: A benefit for AIDS, education and relief which had a section in their program where multiple independent film directors created a series of short films. In this program, Tamra Davis directed a short film called No Alternative Girls which discussed gender inequality.

Tamra Davis also directed Guncrazy (1992), a film which starred actor Drew Barrymore. This film was a remake of the 50s film Gun Crazy. Many books and articles have stated that her film had similar elements to Bonnie and Clyde. Christina Lane acknowledged the mixed reviews for Davis' film. Lane wrote that some thought the film was too violent and others said the violence was necessary for the story she was telling. When asked about the violence of the film Davis said she did it because she wanted a strong emotional reaction from the audience. In the book, Davis expressed that she was not cautious when it came to her audiences’ emotions. Davis stated, "I wanted to say something about how our society abuses people and yet gives them violent possibilities to turn that abuse back onto society." Before the production of the film, Davis researched reactions teenagers had to sexual abuse. Davis said that she also looked at how a teenage girl's everyday life changed after the abuse.

Davis is also known for directing films such as Jean-Michel Basquiat: The Radiant Child, CB4, Billy Madison, and Half Baked and television shows such as My Name Is Earl and Everybody Hates Chris. She also directed the film Crossroads, starring Britney Spears.

For the film CB4, Rupert Wainwright was originally asked to direct the film. Davis was their second choice after Wainwright turned the project down. According to Gwendolyn Audrey Foster, the comedy made fun of the seriousness and sexism of rap music videos while also taking a look at how Hollywood has misused African-American culture in the industry. Foster also examined that Davis was not part of the writing of this film. However, it was noted that she did add her own knowledge of music videos, rap, and politics into the film. ' 'Feminist Hollywood: From Born in Flames to Point Break discussed difficulties Davis had with the production of the film. These difficulties included a limited time to film, the filming conditions due to the heat was difficult, and the script was changed often. The book also mentioned that Tamra Davis speaks highly of her time working on CB4. Foster wrote in her book, Women Film Directors: An International Bio-Critical Dictionary, that this film proved Davis’ skills as a comedy director. (formatting needs fixing)

According to an article in The New York Times, Tamra Davis had trouble finding a good location for the Western for the film she was originally supposed to direct, Bad Girls (1994).

Many sources state that the studio disagreed with the feminist approach Davis was taking for the film Bad Girls (1994). According to multiple sources, many producers were in disagreement with what Davis wanted within the film. Lane revealed that the budget given was not enough to provide Davis with the equipment she needed. In the end, Davis was replaced with director Jonathan Kaplan. With the new director, the script was rewritten and the earlier footage was abandoned.

Currently, Davis has a cooking show showcasing vegetarian fare called Tamra Davis Cooking Show accessible on her website www.tamradaviscookingshow.com. She also wrote a cookbook titled Make Me Something Good to Eat.

Personal life
Davis married Mike D of the Beastie Boys in 1993. They are now legally separated.  They have two children, Skyler and Davis.

Work

BooksMake Me Something Good to Eat'' (2009)

Filmography

Music videos

References

External links
Tamra Davis cooking show website

1962 births
American chefs
American music video directors
American television directors
American cookbook writers
American women film directors
Comedy film directors
Female music video directors
American women television directors
Living people
Los Angeles City College alumni
People from Studio City, Los Angeles
American women chefs
Women cookbook writers
Film directors from Los Angeles
American women non-fiction writers
21st-century American women